Florence Ezekiel (5 December 1932 – 9 February 2006), known professionally as Nadira, was an Indian actress who worked in the Hindi film industry. She appeared in films from the 1950s and 1960s, including Aan (1952), Shree 420 (1955), Pakeezah (1972), and Julie (1975), which won her the Filmfare Best Supporting Actress Award.

Early life
Nadira was born on 5 December 1932 in Baghdad, Iraq, into a Baghdadi Jewish family. When she was an infant, her family migrated from Baghdad to Bombay in search of business opportunities. She had two brothers, one of whom lives in the United States and another in Israel.

Career 
Nadira's first appearance in cinema was in the 1943 Hindi-language film Mauj when she was 10 or 11 years of age.

Her breakthrough came from Sardar Akhtar, wife of film director Mehboob Khan who cast her in the film Aan (1952). Her role as a Rajput princess in the film marked her rise to cinematic prominence. In 1955, she played a rich socialite named Maya in Shree 420. She played pivotal roles in a number of films such as Dil Apna Aur Preet Parai (1960), Pakeezah (1972), Hanste Zakhm (1973), and Amar Akbar Anthony (1977). She was often cast as a temptress or vamp, roles which were used as a foil to the chaste leading lady characters that were favoured at the time by the Hindi film industry.

Nadira won a Filmfare Award for Best Supporting Actress, for her role in the 1975 film Julie. During the 1980s and 1990s, she mostly played supporting characters. Due to her image as a Westernized woman, she often played roles of Christian or Anglo-Indian ladies. Her last role was in the film Josh (2000). 

She was among the highest-paid actresses during her career, and was one of the first Indian actresses to own a Rolls-Royce.

Personal life
In her later years, Nadira lived alone in Mumbai, India, as many of her relatives had moved to Israel. In the last three years before her death, she had been residing in her condominium with only a housekeeper. On 24 January 2006, she suffered a cardiac arrest and was admitted to a hospital in a semi-comatose state. She had multiple existing health problems, including tubercular meningitis, alcoholic liver disorder, and paralysis.

She died on 9 February 2006, at the age of 73, at the Bhatia Hospital in Tardeo, Mumbai, following a prolonged illness. She was survived by her two brothers.

Filmography

References

External links
 

2006 deaths
1932 births
Actresses in Hindi cinema
Indian film actresses
Indian Jews
Jewish actresses
20th-century Indian actresses
21st-century Indian actresses
Baghdadi Jews
Mizrahi Jews
Filmfare Awards winners